Remus Cristian Dănălache (born 14 January 1984) is a Romanian former football goalkeeper who played 31 matches in the Romanian Liga I. In his career, Dănălache played for teams such as Tractorul Brașov, Forex Brașov, ASA 2013 Târgu Mureș or Voința Sibiu, among others.

External links
 
 

1984 births
Living people
Romanian footballers
Association football goalkeepers
FC Brașov (1936) players
Liga I players
Liga II players
ACS Sticla Arieșul Turda players
ASA 2013 Târgu Mureș players
CSU Voința Sibiu players
CS Mioveni players
CSM Corona Brașov footballers
Sportspeople from Brașov